Lizzo's Watch Out for the Big Grrrls is an American reality television series in which 13 women compete to be dancers for singer Lizzo, who also hosts the show. It premiered on March 25, 2022 on Amazon Prime Video.

At the 74th Primetime Emmy Awards, the series received six nominations, and won three including one for Primetime Emmy Award for Outstanding Competition Program.

Contestants
 Jayla Sullivan
 Sydney Bell
 Charity Holloway
 Arianna Davis
 Ashley Williams
 Asia Banks
 Kiara Mooring
 Moesha Perez
 Isabel Jones
 Jasmine Morrison
 Crystal Williams
 Kimberly Arce
 Ki'ana Rowland

Episodes

Reception
The series received mostly positive reviews. Laura Bradley of The Daily Beast wrote, "On paper, Watch Out for the Big Grrrls might sound like a pretty safe prospect; to a cynic’s ear, a house full of women getting along and supporting one another in their dreams doesn’t sound like a breeding ground for compelling stakes. But even if the series can veer dangerously close to treacly territory at times, it’s never saccharine or inauthentic in its tone."

Accolades

References

External links

2022 American television series debuts
2020s American reality television series
Dance competition television shows
English-language television shows
Amazon Prime Video original programming
Television series by Bunim/Murray Productions
Television series by Amazon Studios
Primetime Emmy Award-winning television series